Count Me In may refer to:

Organizations
 Count Me In (movement), a youth-run charitable organization
 Count Me In (charity), a charitable organization that provides support to woman-owned businesses

Music

Albums
 Count Me In (Death Before Dishonor album), 2007
 Count Me In (Jann Browne album), 1995
 Count Me In (Rebelution album), 2014

Songs
 "Count Me In" (Gary Lewis & the Playboys song), 1965 song by Gary Lewis & the Playboys
 "Count Me In" (Deana Carter song), 1997
 "Count Me In" (311 song), 2011
 "Count Me In" (Kris Thomas song), 2013 song by Kris Thomas
 "Count Me In", 2014 song by singer and Disney Channel actress Dove Cameron
 "Count Me In", 2018 song by Lil Yachty from his studio album Lil Boat 2
 "Count Me In", 1985 song by Little River Band from their studio album Playing to Win

Films
 Count Me In (film), a film on drummers directed by Mark Lo